The 2011–12 Ligue Magnus season was the 91st season of the Ligue Magnus, the top level of ice hockey in France. Fourteen teams participated in the league, and Dragons de Rouen won both the regular season title, and the Coupe Magnus, the postseason championship that earned the team the title "Champions of France". The Scorpions de Mulhouse were elevated to the league from Division 1 at the end of the season, and the Bisons de Neuilly-sur-Marne were relegated to Division 1 after finishing the regular season with only three wins and losing the relegation playoff with the Ours de Villard-de-Lans.

Rules
A win, whether in regulation, overtime, or shootout, is worth two points. A loss in overtime or shootout is worth one point. A loss in regulation is worth zero points. During the regular season, every team plays every other team twice, once at home and once away, for a total of 26 games each. During the playoffs, the top four ranked teams automatically enter the quarterfinals, while the fifth through twelfth ranked teams play a preliminary series to determine the quarterfinalists. All preliminary, quarterfinal, and semifinal series are best of five, while the finals are best of seven.

The bottom two ranked teams at the end of the regular season play a relegation series, best of five games, with the winner remaining in the Ligue Magnus, and the loser being relegated to Division 1. The winner of Division 1 is elevated to the Ligue Magnus at the end of the season.

Ranking
Teams are ranked by their point score, with ties broken as follows:
 Points scored in matches between the two teams
 Number of games lost by forfeit
 Number of goals scored in regulation between the two teams
 Goal differential, overall
 Goal differential in pool play
 Number of goals in all games in pool play
If there was a tie after these criteria, a playoff would be held on neutral ice.

Regular season

Postseason

Preliminary round
Played 24 February through 3 March
Gothiques d'Amiens – Étoile noire de Strasbourg 3:2 (2–1, 5–3, 2–4, 2–3, 5–2)
Brûleurs de Loups de Grenoble – Dauphins d'Épinal 3:2 (5–3, 5–3, 3–4, 6–2, 3–2 OT)
Ducs d'Angers – Drakkars de Caen 3:0 (6–1, 6–1, 2–1)
Pingouins de Morzine-Avoriaz – Rapaces de Gap 2:3 (2–3 OT, 6–2, 3–6, 4–3 OT, 4–5 OT)

Quarterfinals
Played 6 through 13 March
Dragons de Rouen – Gothiques d'Amiens 3:2 (4–5, 5–3, 1–0 OT, 1–5, 5–3)
Diables Rouges de Briançon – Ducs d'Angers 1:3 (5–2, 1–4, 2–4, 2–5)
Ducs de Dijon – Brûleurs de Loups de Grenoble 2:3 (3–0, 3–2, 2–3, 1–2 OT, 2–5)
Chamois de Chamonix – Rapaces de Gap 3:1 (2–3 OT, 6–2, 3–0, 5–4 OT)

Semifinals
Played 16 through 24 March
Dragons de Rouen – Ducs d'Angers 3:1 (2–1, 1–2, 7–1, 3–1)
Chamois de Chamonix – Brûleurs de Loups de Grenoble 1:3 (3–4 OT, 5–2, 4–7, 1–7)

Coupe Magnus Final
Played 28 March through 10 April
Dragons de Rouen – Brûleurs de Loups de Grenoble 4:2 (4–3 OT, 8–2, 4–5, 4–6, 5–1, 4–0)

Relegation
Played 24 February through 3 March
Ours de Villard-de-Lans – Bisons de Neuilly-sur-Marne 3:1 (1–0, 7–5, 0–1, 7–2)

External links
 Season on hockeyarchives.info

References

1
Fra
Ligue Magnus seasons